Away is a 2019 animated silent film, written and animated by Gints Zilbalodis, a Latvian film-maker, who also wrote and recorded the score for the film. It is a computer-animated film, using the programme Maya. The film follows a boy who parachutes onto land, where he finds a motorbike and an injured bird.  With these, he sets off to reach an initially unknown goal, pursued by a shadowy giant monster, which drains life from every living being that crosses its path.  The film is divided into different chapters, each individually named.

It was presented at the 2019 Annecy International Animation Film Festival, winning the Contrechamp Award.  It was also presented at the Tokyo Film Festival, and the London International Animation Festival.

Reception 
Variety praised the visual and soundtrack aspects of the movie but highlighted weaknesses in the story-telling. Some reviewers talked about the surreal nature of the work and the minimalist soundtrack.  Several reviewers focussed on the effort required for a single person to create an entire animated film, and the opportunities modern animation software offers to independent film-makers.

Awards 
The film was nominated for the Annie Award for Music in a Feature Production at the 47th Annie Awards.  Away won Best Animated Film at the 2019 Lielais Kristaps, the largest Latvian film awards.  The Lielais Kristaps award jury (which included Lolita Ritmanis, Larisa Gūtmane, Zane Balčus and ) also remarked upon the achievement of one person making an entire film, stating "When awarding the prize, the jury wants to emphasize the film's unique visual and audio fantasy world, which the author has convincingly created alone."

References

External Links 

2019 films
2019 animated films
2019 computer-animated films
Animated films without speech
Latvian animated films